Witchhopple Lake is a lake located by Keepawa, New York. The outlet flows into Salmon Lake and then from there into Stillwater Reservoir. Fish species present in Witchhopple Lake are brook trout, white sucker, sunfish, yellow perch, and splake. Access by trail from the north shore of Stillwater Reservoir. No motors are allowed on Witchhopple Lake. There is a trail that goes from Witchhopple Lake to Negro Lake called Bushwhack Trail.

References 

Lakes of New York (state)
Lakes of Herkimer County, New York